Robert Edward "Red" Dehnert (January 24, 1924 – September 23, 1994) was an American professional basketball player. He played for the Providence Steamrollers for 10 games during the 1946–47 BAA season. He is the nephew of Hall of Fame player Dutch Dehnert.

Dehnert served as the Pottsville Packers' player-coach in 1948–49. That season, the Packers won the Eastern Professional Basketball League championship against the Harrisburg Senators, three games to two in a best-of-five series.

BAA career statistics

Regular season

References

1924 births
1984 deaths
Basketball players from New York City
Columbia Lions men's basketball players
Continental Basketball Association coaches
Forwards (basketball)
Player-coaches
Pottsville Packers players
Professional Basketball League of America players
Providence Steamrollers players
St. John's Red Storm men's basketball players
Wilkes-Barre Barons players
American men's basketball players